The Code of Criminal Procedure, sometimes called the Code of Criminal Procedure of 1965 or the Code of Criminal Procedure, 1965, is an Act of the Texas State Legislature. The Act is a code of the law of criminal procedure of Texas.

The code regulates how criminal trials are carried out in Texas. The code governs important legal processes and constitutional rights and liberties. These include but are not limited to court jurisdictions, protective orders, Habeas Corpus, bail, warrants, legal expenses, and the rights of those affected by criminal actions. 

For the purpose of citation, Texas Code of Criminal Procedure or Texas Criminal Procedure Code may be abbreviated to  Tex Crim Proc or Tex Crim Pro or Tx Crim Proc or Tx Crim Pro or Tx Code Crim Proc or Tx Code Crim Pro or Tex Code Crim Proc or Tex Code Crim Pro or Code Crim Proc Tex or Code Crim Pro Tex.

History 
In the early to mid 20th century, there were numerous efforts to revise the Code of Criminal Procedure by the Texas State Bar and the Supreme Court of Texas that never made it through the state legislature. However, in 1958, the revision of the code was undertaken by a 23-person committee formed of the Texas State Bar with a tripartite goal to remove technicalities and loopholes by which a party can exploit the law, reform the appeal system, and "strike the delicate balance" of protecting the people of Texas from crime while also preventing others from being wrongfully incarcerated. The code was also substantially edited to provide better clarity and more logical organization.

This committee's initial revision was submitted to the rest of the Bar Association in April 1962 and to the state legislature shortly thereafter, being well supported by both bodies and passing with large margins. However, as a result of technicalities and small issues, Texas governor John Connally vetoed the bill containing the revisions, sending the revisal committee back to fix these issues, which they did.

The current Code of Criminal Procedure was enacted in 1965 by Texas Senate Bill 107, 59 R.S. and has been added to and edited since in the 21st century, though not to the same degree.

This code is sometimes called the "new code" as it replaces the previous criminal procedure code. The Code of Criminal Procedure of 1856 was the first criminal procedure code to be enacted in Texas. It was followed by the Code of Criminal Procedure of 1879, the Code of Criminal Procedure of 1895, the Code of Criminal Procedure of 1911, and the Code of Criminal Procedure of 1925.

Organization 
The Texas Code of Criminal Procedure is organized into two Titles, with Title One containing the vast number of statutes and Title Two largely encompassing court expenses and legal fees. The below links are the chapters published on the Texas Legislature website as of 2021.

 Title 1: Code of Criminal Procedure
 Chapter 1: General Provisions
 Chapter 2: General Duties of Officers
 Chapter 3: Definitions
 Chapter 4: Courts and Criminal Jurisdiction
 Chapter 5: Family Violence Prevention
 Chapter 6: Preventing Offenses by the Act of Magistrates and Other Officers; Education Concerning Consequences of Certain Offenses
 Chapter 7: Proceeds Before Magistrates to Prevent Offense
 Chapter 7B: Protective Orders
 Chapter 8: Suppression of Riots and Other Disturbances
 Chapter 9: Offenses Injurious to Public Health
 Chapter 10: (No Chapter 10)
 Chapter 11: Habeas Corpus
 Chapter 12: Limitation
 Chapter 13: Venue
 Chapter 14: Arrest Without Warrant
 Chapter 15: Arrest Under Warrant
 Chapter 16: The Commitment or Discharge of the Accused
 Chapter 17: Bail
 Chapter 17A: Corporations and Associations
 Chapter 18: Search Warrants
 Chapter 18A: Detection, Interception, and Use of Wire, Oral, and Electronic Communications
 Chapter 18B: Installation and Use of Tracking Equipment; Access to Communications
 Chapter 19A: Grand Jury Organization
 Chapter 20A: Grand Jury Proceedings
 Chapter 21: Indictment and Information
 Chapter 22: Forfeiture of Bail
 Chapter 23: The Capias
 Chapter 24: Subpoenas and Attachment
 Chapter 24A: Responding to Subpoenas and Certain Other Court Orders; Preserving Certain Information
 Chapter 25: Service of a Copy of an Indictment
 Chapter 26: Arraignment
 Chapter 27: The Pleading in Criminal Actions
 Chapter 28: Motions, Pleadings, and Exceptions
 Chapter 29: Continuance
 Chapter 30: Disqualification of the Judge
 Chapter 31: Change of Venue
 Chapter 32: Dismissing Prosecutions
 Chapter 32A: Speedy Trial
 Chapter 33: The Mode of Trial
 Chapter 34: Special Venire in Capital Cases
 Chapter 35: Formation of the Jury
 Chapter 36: Trial Before the Jury
 Chapter 37: The Verdict
 Chapter 38: Evidence in Criminal Actions
 Chapter 39: Depositions in Discovery
 Chapter 40: New Trials
 (No Chapter 41)
 Chapter 42: Judgement and Sentence
 Chapter 42A: Community Supervision
 Chapter 43: Execution of Judgement
 Chapter 44: Appeal and Writ of Error
 Chapter 45: Justice and Municipal Courts
 Chapter 46: Miscellaneous Provisions Relating to Mental Illness and Intellectual Disability
 Chapter 46B: Incompetency to Stand Trial
 Chapter 46C: Insanity Defense
 Chapter 47: Disposition of Stolen Property
 Chapter 48: Pardon and Parole
 Chapter 49: Inquests Upon Dead Bodies
 Chapter 50: Fire Inquests
 Chapter 51: Fugitives from Justice
 Chapter 52: Court of Inquiry
 (No Chapter 53)
 (No Chapter 54)
 Chapter 55: Expunction of Criminal Records
 Chapter 56A: Rights of Crime Victims
 Chapter 56B: Crime Victims' Compensation
 (No Chapter 57)
 Chapter 58: Confidentiality of Identifying Information and Medical Records of Certain Crime Victims
 Chapter 59: Forfeiture of Contraband
 (No Chapter 60)
 (No Chapter 61)
 Chapter 62: Sex Offender Registration Program
 Chapter 63: Missing Children and Missing Persons
 Chapter 64: Motion for Forensic DNA Testing
 (No Chapter 65)
 Chapter 66: Criminal History Record System
 Chapter 67: Compilation of Information Pertaining to Combinations and Criminal Street Gangs
 Title 2: Code of Criminal Procedure (Costs, Fees, Expenses)
 Chapter 101: General Provisions
 Chapter 102: Costs, Fines, and Fees Paid by Defendants
 Chapter 103: Payment, Collection, and Record keeping
 Chapter 104: Certain Expenses Paid by State or County

Particular statutes 
Chapter 5, Articles 5.04 and 5.05 detail the duties of peace officers when responding to family violence calls. These include protecting the victim, helping the victim move to a safer place, and providing victims with written instructions about the legal actions they can take to protect themselves from the offender.

Chapter 5, Article 5.08 stipulates that magistrates cannot seek mediation as a valid means of resolving family violence, meaning these cases must remain in the criminal court system after they are reported.

Chapter 7B, Article 7B.003 outlines the requirements for a protective order to be granted to an applicant using the subjective terminology "reasonable grounds to believe." This leaves much of the decision to grant up to the magistrate and places a large burden of proof into applicants.

Chapter 11, Article 11.051 prohibits a fee being attached to an application for a Writ of Habeas Corpus, which would aid someone who might be detained without probable cause.

Chapter 12, Article 12.01, Section 1 states that the statute of limitations for a sexual assault does not expire if there is "biological material" collected and it is not easily identifiable whose it is, or if the offender may have committed similar acts five or more times. Otherwise, according to Section 2, the statute of limitations is 10 years, with exceptions for minors that often coincide with the victim's 18th birthday.

Chapter 17, Article 17.028 stipulates that it must take no more than 48 hours after the arrest for a magistrate to decide whether or not a defendant is offered bail, conditional or unconditional.

Chapter 27, Articles 27.02 and 27.05 encompass pleas that defendants can make. Contrary to popular belief, there are pleas that can be made outside of the "guilty" or "not guilty" binary. One such plea essentially claims double jeopardy while another plea places the punishment if found guilty into the hands of the jury rather than the magistrate. A plea of "nolo contendere" is, according to Texas, essentially a "guilty" plea, except the plea cannot be used in a civil case that may follow a criminal one to prove guilt.

Chapter 32A, Article 32A.01 describes the priorities of the courts. According to this statute, criminal cases are given priority over civil ones and criminal cases where the defendant is being held in jail are given priority over those that aren't. Section C states that if a victim in a case is younger than 14, their case is given priority over all others, even if it is civil in nature.

Chapter 46B, Article 46B.003 stipulates incompetency to stand trial. Under Texas law, a defendant is deemed competent for trial unless it can be proven otherwise. This criteria centers on the defendant's capability to consult their legal team and understand the charges against them. According to Article 46B.004, a motion can be filed by either the prosecution or defense that seeks to deem the defendant incompetent and if it passes, according to Section D, all court proceedings are paused.

Chapter 56A, Article 56A.052 stipulates extra rights for victims of sexual crimes such as access to evidence, lab sample analyses, and counseling if the victim has been infected with HIV or developed AIDS as a result of the crime. Subsection 4, Paragraph A also establishes that sex crime victims have a right to be tested for these diseases.

Chapter 58, Article 58.052 establishes an address confidentiality program, which keeps applicants' address hidden in cases where further violence against the victim or those related to them is possible. Article 58.055 details the necessary parts of the application, which includes sworn statements about possible danger.

Chapter 58, Article 58.102 states that a victim in a sexual crime case can choose to be referred to by a pseudonym if a form is completed. Section B stipulates that all law enforcement agencies in the state must have these forms available for anyone wishing to use them. All information within these forms, and the form itself, is kept strictly confidential.

Chapter 64, Article 64.01 stipulates the conditions necessary for a convicted person to ask for DNA testing to be done on evidence that might exonerate the person. First off, the evidence must be likely to contain DNA. Second, the motion must be filed with a sworn statement from the defendant. Third, the evidence must have been used in the conviction and be in the court's possession. Fourth, was not already tested or could be tested with better testing technology.

Terminology 
Below is a list of some of the legal terms that appear within the Code of Criminal Procedure.

 Magistrate is defined by Article 2.09 of the Code.
 Peace officer is defined by Article 2.12 of the Code.
 Witnesses are persons who give written or oral testimony at a court hearing.
 Defendants are persons who are accused of committing a crime.
 Prosecutors are the lawyers who are seeking to prove the charges against the defendant.
 Petit Juries are the unassociated, impartial group of six to twelve civilians who adjudicate evidence and pass verdicts.
 Grand Juries are the unassociated, impartial group of more than 12 citizens who decide whether a prosecutor has probable cause to continue a case.
 Indictment is defined by Article 21.01 of the Code.
 Depositions are statements made under oath during a trial in which facts or information are shared.
 Warrants are court issued documents giving legal authority to officers in order to conduct searches or arrests.
 Pleas are a statements issued by the defendant and their legal team of either "guilty" or "not guilty." "Guilty" pleas can be used to achieve less harsh sentencing or avoid a lengthy trial while "not guilty" pleas often result in the trial's inception.
 Pleadings, not to be confused with pleas, are statements submitted to the court by the prosecution or defendant that seek to establish facts relevant to the case

See also
Law of Texas
Texas Penal Code

References
Amanda Peters. Texas Criminal Procedure. First Edition. Wolters Kluwer. 2017. Second Edition:  . Aspen Publishing. 2019. Third Edition. Aspen Publishing. Dated 2023.
John F Onion Jr, "A New Code of Criminal Procedure for Texas" (1965) 9 Public Affairs Comment 1 (November 1965); "A New Code of Criminal Procedure for Texas" in Practicing Texas Politics, Houghton Mifflin, 1971, Chapter 5-6, p 288.
Luther E Jones and Warren Burnett, "The New Texas Code of Criminal Procedure" (1965) 8 South Texas Law Journal 16 HeinOnline
Carol S Vance, "The 1967 Amendments to the Texas Code of Criminal Procedure; A Prosecutor's Reflections" (1968) 10 South Texas Law Journal 214 or 215
John F Onion Jr and Warren E White, "Texas Code of Criminal Procedure: Its 1965 & 1967 changes affecting Corporation Courts and Police Practices" (1968) 10 South Texas Law Journal 92
Gary A Udashen and Barry Sorrels, "Criminal Procedure: Confession, Search and Seizure" (1991) 45 Southwestern Law Journal 263 (No 1, Summer 1991) (Annual Survey of Texas Law) HeinOnline
Gary A Udashen and Robert Udashen, "Criminal Procedure: Confession, Search and Seizure" (1993) 46 SMU Law Review 1237 (No 4, Spring 1993) (Annual Survey of Texas Law) HeinOnline
Robert Udashen, "Criminal Procedure: Pretrial" (1987) 41 Southwestern Law Journal 517 (No 1, April 1987) (Annual Survey of Texas Law) HeinOnline
Robert Udashen, "Criminal Procedure: Pretrial" (1988) 42 Southwestern Law Journal 581 (No 1, April 1988) (Annual Survey of Texas Law) HeinOnline
Robert Udashen, "Criminal Procedure: Pretrial" (1989) 43 Southwestern Law Journal 535 (No 1, June 1989) (Annual Survey of Texas Law) HeinOnline
Robert Udashen, "Criminal Procedure: Pretrial" (1990) 44 Southwestern Law Journal 587 (No 1, Summer 1990) (Annual Survey of Texas Law) HeinOnline
Robert N Udashen, "Criminal Procedure: Pretrial" (1991) 45 Southwestern Law Journal 279 (No 1, Summer 1991) (Annual Survey of Texas Law) HeinOnline
Kerry P Fitzgerald, "Criminal Procedure: Pretrial, Trial and Appeal" (1991 to 1992) 45 Southwestern Law Journal 1593 (Annual Survey of Texas Law) HeinOnline
Kerry P FitzGerald and Catherine Greene Burnett, "Criminal Procedure: Pretrial, Trial and Appeal" (1993) 46 SMU Law Review 1261 (No 4, Spring 1993) (Annual Survey of Texas Law) HeinOnline
Robert Udashen and Gary A Udashen, "Criminal Procedure: Pretrial, Trial and Appeal" (1994) 47 SMU Law Review 995 (No 4, Spring 1994) (Annual Survey of Texas Law) HeinOnline
Robert N Udashen, Gary A Udashen and George R Milner, "Criminal Procedure: Pretrial, Trial and Appeal" (1995) 48 SMU Law Review 1047 (No 4, May to June 1995) (Annual Survey of Texas Law) HeinOnline
"Criminal Procedure: Pretrial, Trial and Appeal" (2002) 55 SMU Law Review 837 (Annual Survey of Texas Law)
George E Dicks, "Entry to Execute Search Warrants in Texas Criminal Procedure" (1992) 19 American Journal of Criminal Law 159 (No 2, Winter 1992)

Texas statutes
Criminal procedure